Junction-mediating and regulatory protein, or JMY, is a 110 kDa protein that interacts with p300 and has a role in regulating p53 activity. Additionally, JMY is a member of the WASp family of actin nucleators.

References 

Proteins